Wade Burleson is a politician, author, avocational historian, and retired pastor for Emmanuel Enid church in Enid, Oklahoma, United States. Burleson was twice elected President of the Baptist General Convention of Oklahoma, serving between 2002 and 2004. He later served as a trustee for the Southern Baptist Convention's International Mission Board from 2005 to 2008. Oklahoma Governor Frank Keating appointed Burleson to the northwest Oklahoma Higher Education Program Board in 1996.

He is a speaker on the Civil War in Oklahoma, the assassination of Abraham Lincoln, conspiracies associated with assassin John Wilkes Booth, and the history of the National Football League with its roots in Indian Territory.

Career 
In 1992, Burleson moved from Texas to Enid, Oklahoma to pastor for Emmanuel Baptist Church.
Burleson was appointed to serve on Oklahoma's Higher Education Program Board in 1996 by Governor Frank Keating. In 2002, he was elected the President of the Baptist General Convention of Oklahoma and he was reelected to the position in 2003. He was elected to the Southern Baptist Convention International Mission Board in 2005. In 2006, his fellow members requested his removal from the board, citing "gossip, slander, lack of accountability and loss of trust." A month later, IMB officers withdrew the request for removal. 

Burleson has publicly advocated for the removal of elected officials, advocating for their removal in court filings. These political stances were taken on church letterhead, as the office of Lead Pastor. The effort Burleson advocated was later found to be "fatally-flawed" by the Oklahoma Supreme Court.

2022 ‘Burleson for Congress’ campaign 
On February 1, 2022, Burleson announced his candidacy as a Republican to represent Oklahoma's 3rd congressional district in the U.S. House of Representatives, challenging incumbent Frank Lucas; he lost in the primary to Lucas.

Gender equality 
Christians for Biblical Equality awarded Burleson the International Priscilla and Aquila Award for his advocacy of gender equality. 

The termination of Sheri Klouda would not have been publicly known except for it being highlighted on Burleson's blog. 

Burleson was a speaker at a rally for women during the 2018 Convention in Dallas, telling messengers that "The New Testament we say we believe teaches us Jesus Christ sets women free to serve, to lead, to minister."

Proposed database of sexual predators 

In 2007, Burleson recommended the creation of a database to track sexually abusive ministers.

Istoria Ministries blog 
In 2005, Burleson used his blog, Istoria Ministries, to identify what he called "the continuing narrowing of the doctrinal parameters of fellowship and cooperation in the area of missions and evangelism by demanding conformity and agreement on nonessential doctrines." 

In May 2015, policies implemented by International Mission Board and spoken against by Burleson, leading to his censure by the IMB, were reversed.

In May 2015, the IMB trustees reversed its controversial missionary qualification policies and implemented the changes that Burleson had recommended a decade earlier.  In May 2015, Christianity Today reported on the IMB policy reversals, writing, "Former IMB trustee Wade Burleson, pastor of Emmanuel Baptist Church in Enid, Oklahoma, clashed with other trustees over the policies. In 2006, a group of trustees tried to oust him from the IMB board, but that attempt failed."

Awards and honors 
Burleson received the Outstanding Achievement Award by the Oklahoma Association of Broadcasters for his radio and television ministry.

Burleson spoke on the subject of respecting women during the 2009 regional New Baptist Covenant meeting in Norman, Oklahoma.

Burleson was awarded the International Priscilla and Aquila Award for his advocacy of gender equality.

Personal life

Pastor Wade Burleson has been married to Dr. Rachelle Burleson, DNP, chief nursing officer at St. Mary's Regional Medical Center, for over 30 years. They have four adult children and three grandchildren. In 2011, Burleson was briefly jailed in Mexico after causing a traffic collision that injured two.

Burleson retired from Lead Pastor at Emmanuel Enid in 2022.

Bibliography

Electoral history

References

1961 births
Baptists from Oklahoma
Baylor University alumni
Candidates in the 2022 United States House of Representatives elections
Christian bloggers
East Central University alumni
Living people
Southern New Hampshire University alumni
Writers from Enid, Oklahoma